Nuevo Mundo Airport  is an airport in the lightly populated pampa of the Beni Department in Bolivia.

See also

Transport in Bolivia
List of airports in Bolivia

References

External links 
OpenStreetMap - Nuevo Mundo
OurAirports - Nuevo Mundo
FallingRain - Nuevo Mundo Airport
Google Maps - Nuevo Mundo

Airports in Beni Department